Baek Nak-jun (March 9, 1895January 13, 1985) was a South Korean politician, who was an acting president for a brief time during the Second Korean Republic. Baek was also known by his English name, "George Paik" and his nickname, "Yongjae".

Early life and education
Baek was born on March 9, 1895, and was the second son among six children.

See also 
 April 19 Movement
 Politics of South Korea
 History of South Korea
 Syngman Rhee
 Park Chung-hee

References 

1895 births
1985 deaths
Korean nationalists
Acting presidents of South Korea
Second Republic of Korea
20th-century South Korean politicians
Speakers of the National Assembly (South Korea)
Park University alumni
Princeton University alumni
Academic staff of Yonsei University
Presidents of universities and colleges in South Korea
Members of the National Academy of Sciences of the Republic of Korea